Kevyn Major Howard is a Canadian actor best known for his role as "Rafterman" in Stanley Kubrick's Full Metal Jacket.

Life and career
After acting in high school, Howard moved to Los Angeles and Hollywood in the late 1970s. His  headshot was delivered to Paramount Pictures and, shortly thereafter, he was called in and booked for his first major film role, in The Serial, with Martin Mull, Tuesday Weld, Sally Kellerman, Pamela Bellwood and Peter Bonerz. This was followed by the film Scared Straight Another Story.
In 1988, he appeared in the episode "Line of Fire" of the cult TV series Miami Vice'''

In the BBC show The Human Face'', Howard is touted as the "King of the Hollywood headshot" as he has become a leading headshot photographer after retiring from acting.

Filmography

References

External links
 
  as Kevin Howard in 'Serial'
 E Online – Credits – Kevyn Major Howard
 IFILM – People – Kevyn Major Howard
 
 TLC/Discovery interview

Canadian male film actors
Canadian male television actors
Year of birth missing (living people)
Living people
20th-century Canadian male actors